Heart Shaped World is the debut studio album of American country music singer Jessica Andrews.  It was released on March 23, 1999, and it produced four singles on the Hot Country Songs charts: "I Will Be There for You", "You Go First (Do You Wanna Kiss)", "Unbreakable Heart", and "I Do Now". "I Will Be There for You" was also included on the Nashville soundtrack to the 1998 film The Prince of Egypt. "Unbreakable Heart" was originally recorded by Carlene Carter on her 1993 album Little Love Letters.

Critical reception

Alex Henderson of AllMusic gives the album 3½ out of a possible 5 stars and writes, "as much sweetness as she projects, Andrews isn't bubblegum -- when she digs into "You Go First," "I've Been Waiting for You," and "James Dean in Tennessee," you know that the singer isn't without an edge. And on Billy Burnette's ominous, bluesy "Hungry Love"—the tale of a girl who has to grow up much too fast—it's clear that Andrews is capable of depth."

Eli Messinger reviews the album for Country Standard Time and says, "Andrews has skipped a few squares, singing at an emotional level at odds with her actual age. And though this formula has worked before (notably for LeAnn Rimes), one hopes her life experience will catch up with her talent."

Track listing

Personnel
Jessica Andrews- lead vocals, background vocals
Larry Beaird- acoustic guitar
Mike Brignardello- bass guitar
Larry Byrom- acoustic guitar
Mark Casstevens- banjo
Dan Dugmore- steel guitar
Stuart Duncan- fiddle, mandolin
Paul Franklin- steel guitar
Byron Gallimore- bass guitar, acoustic guitar, electric guitar, keyboards, piano
Aubrey Haynie- fiddle, mandolin
Michael Landau- electric guitar
B. James Lowry- electric guitar
Brent Mason- electric guitar
Terry McMillan- harmonica, percussion
Michael Mellett- background vocals
The Nashville String Machine- strings
Steve Nathan- keyboards, piano
Kim Parent- background vocals
Chris Rodriguez- background vocals
Russell Terrell- background vocals
Biff Watson- acoustic guitar
Bergen White- string arrangements
Lonnie Wilson- drums
Glenn Worf- bass guitar

Chart performance

Album

Singles

References

1999 debut albums
Jessica Andrews albums
DreamWorks Records albums
Albums produced by Byron Gallimore